The Bahamas first participated at the Olympic Games in 1952, and has sent athletes to compete in every Summer Olympic Games since then, except when they participated in the American-led boycott of the 1980 Summer Olympics.  The nation has never participated in any Winter Olympic Games.

Bahamian athletes have won a total of sixteen medals, all in athletics and sailing. The Bahamas has won more Olympic medals than any other country with a population under one million. 

The National Olympic Committee for The Bahamas is the Bahamas Olympic Committee, and was created in 1952.

Medal tables

Medals by Summer Games

Medals by sport

List of medalists

Flagbearers 

Summer Olympics

See also 
 Bahamas at the Paralympics

External links
 
 
 

 
Olympic competitors for the Bahamas
Bahamian culture